Margery Beddow (December 13, 1937 – January 3, 2010) was an American actress, dancer, director and choreographer.

Early years
In her early career, Beddow was a prima ballerina of the Ballets Russes de Monte Carlo and a dancer with the Metropolitan Opera Ballet.

Career
Beddow appeared on Broadway in Redhead, Conquering Hero, We Take the Town, Two on the Aisle, Almanac, Take Me Along, Ulysses in Nighttown, and revivals of Fiorello! and Show Boat. She appeared in seven Bob Fosse musicals. She had a small part in the Mel Brooks film The Producers and also appeared in the musical based on the film. She was in the rotating cast of the Off-Broadway staged reading of Wit & Wisdom.

Aside from Broadway, she choreographed many industrial shows including Chevrolet and Westinghouse in the 1970s. While touring the 1976 production of El Grande de Coca-Cola, she met co-actor Stephen Sweet with whom she had a long-standing relationship who coincidentally was one of the co-stars in the film Last House on Dead End Street.

In 2008, Beddow appeared as Mrs. Shields in the film version of the award-winning play, Doubt, which starred Meryl Streep and Amy Adams.

Death
Beddow died on January 3, 2010, aged 72, at her home in New York from undisclosed causes. Her daughter, Pamela Saunders, was by her side.

References

1937 births
2010 deaths
Ballet Russe de Monte Carlo dancers
American ballerinas
American female dancers
American dancers
American theatre directors
Women theatre directors
American stage actresses
American musical theatre actresses
American choreographers
Actresses from Michigan
21st-century American women
20th-century American ballet dancers